The Stephen F. Austin Ladyjacks softball team represents the Stephen F. Austin State University, located in Nacogdoches, Texas. The Ladyjacks are a member of the Western Athletic Conference and participate in NCAA Division I college softball. The team is currently led by head coach Nicole Dickson and plays home games at SFA Softball Field.

Postseason appearances
Division II Level

Women's College World Series:

 1978
1983
1985
1986 Champions

Division I Level

NISC Tournament:

 2018
 2019

References

External links
Official Website